Dumitru Manea (7 December 1948 – 31 May 2011) was a Romanian football left defender and manager. After he retired from playing football he worked mainly at Sportul Studențesc București's youth center where he taught and formed generations of players, which include Costin Lazăr, Gheorghe Bucur, Ionuț Mazilu, George Galamaz, Eduard Stăncioiu and Cristian Irimia. His daughter, Oana Manea was a handball player.

International career
Dumitru Manea played three games at international level for Romania, making his debut in a friendly which ended 1–1 against Czechoslovakia played on the 23 August stadium from Bucharest. He also played in a 3–2 victory against Bulgaria in 1976 at the Balkan Cup.

Honours
Steaua București
Divizia A: 1967–68
Cupa României: 1966–67, 1968–69, 1969–70, 1970–71
Sportul Studențesc București
Balkans Cup: 1979–80

References

External links
Dumitru Manea at Labtof.ro

1948 births
2011 deaths
Romanian footballers
Romania international footballers
Association football defenders
Liga I players
Liga II players
FC Steaua București players
FC Sportul Studențesc București players
FCM Târgoviște players
Romanian football managers
People from Ilfov County